= Druvciems =

Neighbourhood of Jūrmala, Latvia

Coordinates: 56°57′N 23°45′E

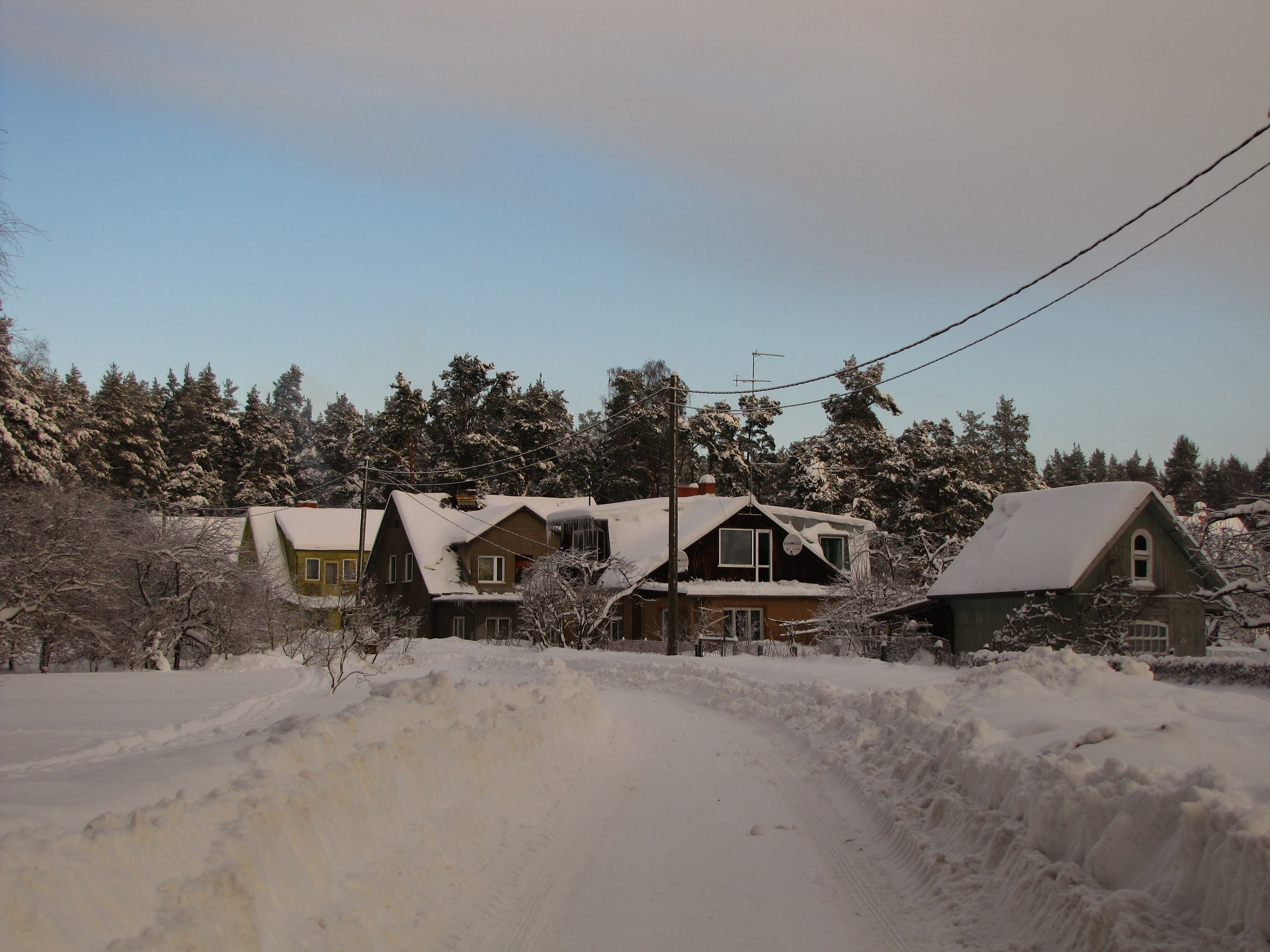

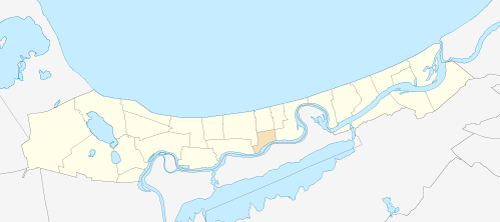
- Location in Jūrmala
- Country: Latvia
- City: Jūrmala

Area
  - Total: 1.5 km^{2} (0.58 sq mi)
- Elevation: 3 m (9.8 ft)

Population (2008)
  - Total: 286
  - Density: 190.7/km^{2} (494/sq mi)

Druvciems is a residential area and neighbourhood of the city Jūrmala, Latvia.
